Rebecca J. Kent is a Canadian politician. She represented the electoral district of Cole Harbour-Eastern Passage in the Nova Scotia House of Assembly from 2007 to 2013. She was a member of the Nova Scotia New Democratic Party.

Kent, an early childhood educator, was elected as a municipal councillor for the Halifax Regional Municipality district of Woodside-Eastern Passage in 2004. She entered provincial politics in October 2007, winning a by-election in the Cole Harbour-Eastern Passage riding. She was re-elected in the 2009 election. In January 2011, Kent was elected Deputy Speaker. In March 2013, she was appointed ministerial assistant to the Minister of Education. Kent was defeated by Liberal Joyce Treen when she ran for re-election in the 2013 election.

Electoral record

|-
} 
|Liberal
|Joyce Treen
|align="right"|3,057
|align="right"|40.62
|align="right"|
|-
} 
|New Democratic Party
|Becky Kent
|align="right"|2,914
|align="right"|38.72
|align="right"|
|-

|Progressive Conservative
|Lloyd Jackson
|align="right"|1,555
|align="right"|20.66
|align="right"|

|}

|-
} 
|New Democratic Party
|Becky Kent
|align="right"|4,402
|align="right"|65.17
|align="right"|
|-

|Progressive Conservative Party
|Lloyd Jackson
|align="right"|1,074
|align="right"|15.9
|align="right"|
|-
} 
|Liberal Party
|Orest Ulan
|align="right"|1,054
|align="right"|15.6
|align="right"|
|-

|}

|-
} 
|New Democratic Party
|Becky Kent
|align="right"|2,459
|align="right"|44.39
|align="right"|
|-

|Progressive Conservative Party
|Michael Eddy
|align="right"|1,863
|align="right"|33.63
|align="right"|
|-
} 
|Liberal Party
|Kelly Rambeau
|align="right"|958
|align="right"|17.30
|align="right"|
|-

|}

References

Year of birth missing (living people)
Nova Scotia New Democratic Party MLAs
Halifax Regional Municipality councillors
Women MLAs in Nova Scotia
Living people
Women municipal councillors in Canada
21st-century Canadian politicians
21st-century Canadian women politicians